Aspidistra alata is a species of flowering plant. A. alata grows in evergreen and semideciduous forests on slopes of limestone mountains in Vietnam. Its name is derived from the Latin alatus, meaning "winged", referring to its thin keels on perigone lobes.

Description
This species is a perennial herb.

Flowers are found solitary, with a decumbent peduncle,  in size, showing two bracts halfway and one at its base. It counts with 6 lobes, which are ligulate with rounded and reflexed tips, each with 4 thin, parallel keels which fuse with each other and basally run to the base of the tube.

Distribution
Aspidistra alata is known from three places in Cao Bằng Province, being adjacent to the Guangxi (China). It also occurs in Guangxi, the same way some Aspidistra species found in southern Guangxi sometimes venture to Cao Bằng.

References

Further reading
Tillich, H‐J. "An updated and improved determination key for Aspidistra Ker‐Gawl.(Ruscaceae, Monocotyledons)." Feddes Repertorium 119.5‐6 (2008): 449–462.
Tillich, Hans-Juergen. "The genus Aspidistra Ker-Gawl.(Asparagaceae) in Vietnam." Taiwania 59.1 (2014): 1–8.
ROSTER, GIORGIO. "CATALOGO: DELLE PIANTE SPERIMENTATE NEL GIARDINO DELL'OTTONELLA (Isola d'Elba)(Continuazione)." Bullettino della R. Società Toscana di Orticultura (1902): 170–177.

External links

alata
Flora of Vietnam
Plants described in 2007